Ramonovo Kouzlo (English: Ramon's Spell) is a Slovakian graphic adventure video game developed by Riki Computer Games and published by Vochozka Trading in 1995 for DOS.

Production 
The game was made in 1995 by Slovakian developer Riki Computer Games, by a team led by Richard Pintér. Nevertheless, the game's development took place within the Czech Republic, and it includes subtitles in Czech. The game's graphic processing was different to that of previous games; the style of having digitized picture screens was inspired by some Sierra Entertainment games. The company disbanded three years later and reformed as Mayhem Studios.

Gameplay and plot
The title is a point and click adventure game consisting of a series of static photographs and no animation. The game is set in Nové Město nad Metují, where the evil wizard Ramon settled and enslaved good elves. It is the player's task to free the city from Ramon and save the elves from the curse.

Critical reception
The game received a negative review in Riki magazine.

The title was the first Czech video game with scanned photographs.

References

External links 
 Excalibur review
 Pařeniště review
 Riki article
 Score article (part 2)

1995 video games
Adventure games
DOS games
DOS-only games
Point-and-click adventure games
Video games about curses
Video games developed in Slovakia
Video games set in the Czech Republic
Vochozka Trading games
Riki Computer Games games